In Welsh tradition, Hueil mab Caw (also spelled Huail or Cuillus) was a Pictish warrior and traditional rival of King Arthur's. He was one of the numerous sons of Caw of Prydyn and brother to Saint Gildas.

The Latin Life of Gildas by Caradoc of Llancarfan describes Hueil as an "active warrior and most distinguished soldier", who led a number of violent and sweeping raids from Scotland down into Arthur's territory. As a result, Arthur marched on Hueil and pursued him as far as the Isle of Man, where he killed the young plunderer. Giraldus Cambrensis alludes to this tradition, claiming that Gildas destroyed "a number of outstanding books" praising Arthur after hearing of the death of his brother.

A variation of Hueil's death, chronicled by Elis Gruffudd, is as follows:

The feud between Hueil and Arthur is further alluded to in the early Arthurian tale Culhwch and Olwen in which Hueil alongside his many brothers is a knight of Arthur's court and is described as having "never submitted to a lord's hand." The text refers to an incident in which Hueil stabbed his nephew, Gwydre ap Llwydeu, which was the source of the enmity between them. The Welsh Triads refer to Hueil as one of the three "battle-diademed" warriors alongside Cai and Drustan, but inferior to Bedwyr.

Hueil is further mentioned in the late twelfth century Englynion y Clyweit, a collection of proverbial englyns attributed to various historical and mythological heroes. The text describes him as "the son of Caw, whose saying was just" and claims that he once sang the proverb "Often will a curse fall from the bosom."

References

Welsh mythology
Arthurian characters